John Kearns (born 10 April 1987) is an English comedian. He was awarded the Fosters Edinburgh Comedy Award in 2014, following on from winning the Best Newcomer Award in 2013. He is the first and only comedian to have done this in the history of the Edinburgh Comedy Awards. Kearns' wins were also notable as both shows appeared on PBH's Free Fringe, making his 2013 win the first ever for a free show. In 2014 he was nominated for three Chortle Awards and was nominated in 2014 and 2015 for the Melbourne Barry Award.

Early life
Having grown up in Tooting, London, Kearns attended the University of East Anglia. In 2006, while at the university, he performed at Tom Moran's Laugh Out Loud comedy nights with fellow young student comedians Pat Cahill, Jon Brittain and Joz Norris. Kearns, Norris and Cahill returned to the university as part of its 50th anniversary celebrations in September 2013. With Cahill, Kearns performed in the Edinburgh Fringe show 'Dinner Party' (which was produced by Fringe stalwart Harry Deansway) and again at the 2012 Fringe as part of the Pleasance Reserve, going on to take the lead role of Peter in the Weirdos Comedy Club reproduction of Hook in December 2012. At university he lived with fellow comedian Cahil and radio DJ Greg James. From 2010 until 2013, he worked as a tour guide at the Houses of Parliament.

Career

Sight Gags for Perverts
Taking its name from a list that film director Stanley Kubrick kept of titles in search of a script, the show was apparently written while on a solitary visit to Berlin, with the trip itself providing a narrative backbone. This, his first solo hour-long show, was directed by his friend the playwright Jon Brittain and made its debut at Leicester Comedy Festival in February 2013, receiving positive notices. The show was performed again at the Machynlleth Comedy Festival in May to a sell-out crowd. Kearns then took the show to the Edinburgh Fringe in August 2013.  Performing as part of the PBH Free Fringe, the show was very well received,  culminating in a five-star review from Chortle's Steve Bennett and a nomination as Best Newcomer in the Fosters Comedy Awards. On Saturday 24 August 2013 he won the award, with Bridget Christie winning the main award.

Shtick
Kearns' follow up, appearing at the Leicester Comedy Festival as No More Mr. Niche Guy, later becoming Shtick, acknowledges the impact of his previous show's success on himself and his career. Directed again by Brittain and returning to the same venue that had hosted his 2013 Edinburgh Festival Fringe run, The Voodoo Rooms, the show saw positive reactions from audiences and press, as well as another Fosters Comedy Awards nomination, this time for Best Show. On 23 August 2014, he won the award, becoming the first act to win Best Newcomer and Best Show in consecutive years.

Television
Kearns starred in BBC Three's Top Coppers alongside Steen Raskopoulos.

Kearns is the assistant host of Comedy Central panel show Guessable.

Kearns appeared in comedy panel show 8 Out of 10 Cats Does Coundown as guest in dictionary corner Jun 08, 2017.

In 2022 Kearns was a contestant on the 14th series of Taskmaster on Channel 4.

References

External links
John Kearns
Festival diary
John Kearns at ComedyBlogedy
John Kearns on Twitter

1987 births
Living people
Alumni of the University of East Anglia
English male comedians